Gordon Eugene Smiley (April 20, 1946 – May 15, 1982) was an American race car driver who was killed in a single-car crash at the Indianapolis Motor Speedway. He was inducted into the Nebraska Auto Racing Hall of Fame in 2000.

SCCA and road racing career

Driving his first race at age 19, Smiley was an accomplished road racer.  He raced SCCA Formula Ford, Formula Atlantic, Formula 1000, Can-Am, Formula 5000 and Formula Super Vee, winning in each series while setting 25 track records, winning the SCCA Midwest Divisional Championship four times. He recorded two pole positions at the SCCA National Championship Runoffs, with a best finish of second in Formula Ford in 1971.

In 1979, he raced in the British Formula One Championship (sometimes called the "Aurora Formula One Championship") for the Surtees Team, and in 11 races he had eight top-10 finishes, including a win, which is the last by an American in an FIA sanctioned event, at Silverstone, England in 1979. He also disputed the F1 non-championship 1979 Race of Champions in Brands Hatch, finishing 10th with a Tyrrell.

Indy career

Smiley raced in the Indianapolis 500 twice, in 1980 and 1981, and was killed while trying to qualify for a third in 1982.

In the 1980 Indianapolis 500, Smiley qualified Patrick Racing's Valvoline Phoenix/Cosworth in 20th position. His race ended when the turbocharger blew on lap 47, causing him to finish 25th. In the 1981 Indianapolis 500, Smiley qualified the Patrick Racing Intermedics Wildcat VIII/Cosworth, qualifying 8th and led 1 lap, but finishing 22nd after a crash on lap 141. His crash set up the controversial finish to the Indy 500 between teammate Mario Andretti and Bobby Unser.

After the 1981 CART season ended, Smiley was released from Patrick Racing, but was essentially traded to a Patrick-affiliated ride, Fletcher Racing.

Death
In 1982, record speeds were being set during qualification for the 1982 Indianapolis 500. Both Kevin Cogan and Rick Mears set new single lap and 4-lap records in their attempts.

Smiley went out for a qualifying attempt an hour later. On the second warm up lap his car began to oversteer while rounding the third turn, causing the car to slightly slide. The impact shattered the March chassis, which completely disintegrated, causing the fuel tank to explode, and sent debris, including Smiley's exposed body, into the catch fence and then back onto the track, tumbling hundreds of feet across the short-chute connecting turns 3 and 4. Smiley died instantly from massive trauma inflicted by the severe impact. His death was the first at Indy since 1973 when Art Pollard and Swede Savage were killed and, to date, the last driver to die during qualifying.

Smiley's funeral was held on May 20, 1982 and he was buried in his birth location in Nebraska.

CART medical director Steve Olvey, who was on staff at the time, discussed the crash in his 2006 autobiography, Rapid Response: My Inside Story as a Motor Racing Life-Saver:

Olvey later said in his book that in the aftermath of the wreck, he and the IndyCar paramedic team declared Smiley to have died at the scene. It caused a circus and led to the racing standard of not declaring a driver dead at the track unless he is incinerated or decapitated.

Smiley's team-mate Desiré Wilson was in the pit garage when the remains of his car were brought back. In 2010, she recounted:

Racing record

SCCA National Championship Runoffs

Indianapolis 500 results

See also

 List of fatalities at the Indianapolis Motor Speedway

References

External links
 

1949 births
1982 deaths
Atlantic Championship drivers
Filmed deaths in motorsport
Indianapolis 500 drivers
Sportspeople from Omaha, Nebraska
Racing drivers from Nebraska
Racing drivers who died while racing
Sports deaths in Indiana
Trans-Am Series drivers
SCCA Formula Super Vee drivers
British Formula One Championship drivers
Champ Car drivers